Matthew Thomas Hamshaw (born 1 January 1982) is an English professional footballer who is the first team coach at Derby County. He has previously played for Sheffield Wednesday, Stockport County, Mansfield Town and Notts County. He usually plays on the right side of midfield.

Career

Sheffield Wednesday
Born in Rotherham, South Yorkshire, Hamshaw came through the youth system at Sheffield Wednesday and represented England at schoolboy and under 18 level. He made his first-team debut in August 2000 and made 89 appearances, scoring six goals, in four seasons. After Sheffield Wednesday won the Football League One play-off final in May 2005, he was one of several players released by manager Paul Sturrock

Stockport County
He then joined Stockport County, where he was made captain and made 44 first-team appearances, scoring five goals in the 2005–06 season. He was released by Stockport at the end of the 2005–06 season,

Mansfield Town
and signed a two-year contract with Mansfield Town in June 2006. After Mansfield Town were relegated to the Conference National at the end of the 2007–08 season, he was released by the club. Hamshaw had made over 90 appearances in all competitions for Mansfield Town.

Notts County
His next move was to join Notts County for two years. On 10 May 2010 it was announced that he had been released by Notts County along with 7 other players.

Macclesfield Town
On 26 July he signed for Macclesfield Town on a one-year deal. On 18 May 2011 he signed a further one-year extension contract at Macclesfield Town. In May 2012, Hamshaw was released by Macclesfield due to the expiry of his contract.

Matlock Town
In September 2012 he signed for Matlock Town of the Evo-Stik League Premier Division and scored on his debut against Blyth Spartans.

Stocksbridge Park Steels
In October 2012 he moved to Stocksbridge Park Steels.

Rotherham United Coaching Career
As Hamshaw's playing career came to an end, he began working at Rotherham United in various coaching capacities. After his contract with relegated Macclesfield Town ran out in the summer of 2012, Matt made the switch into full-time coaching with the Millers, whilst continuing to play in the Evo-Stick League for Stocksbridge Park Steels. Taking on the role of Development Phase Lead Coach, he oversees the development of the 12-16 year olds at New York, while also coaching youngsters at Thomas Rotherham College.

Personal
He is married to Kerry, 33 and has two daughters. Their firstborn child, a son born in 2007, was stillborn.

References

External links

1982 births
Footballers from Rotherham
Living people
Association football midfielders
English footballers
Sheffield Wednesday F.C. players
Stockport County F.C. players
Mansfield Town F.C. players
Notts County F.C. players
Macclesfield Town F.C. players
Matlock Town F.C. players
Stocksbridge Park Steels F.C. players
English Football League players
Rotherham United F.C. non-playing staff